The Upper East Side is a neighborhood in the borough of Manhattan in New York City. It has a long tradition of being home to some of the world's most wealthy, powerful and influential families and individuals.

A
 Roman Abramovich (born 1966) – businessman, investor, and politician
 Roger Ailes – television executive
 Woody Allen (born 1935) –  film director, writer, and actor
 Herbert Allen Jr. (born 1940) – businessman
 George B. Agnew (1868–1941) – politician
 Rand Araskog (1931–2021) – businessman
 Elizabeth Arden (1878–1966) – businesswoman
 Brooke Astor (1902–2007) –  philanthropist and widow of Vincent Astor
 Caroline Schermerhorn Astor (1930–2008) – socialite
 John Jacob Astor IV (1864–1912) – businessman, real estate builder, investor, inventor, writer, lieutenant colonel in the Spanish–American War, who was a passenger on the RMS Titanic and chose to remain on the ship when it sank
 Vincent Astor (1891–1959) – businessman, philanthropist, and member of the prominent Astor family
 William Acquavella (born 1937/38) – art dealer

B
 Louis Bacon – hedge fund manager
 Jules Bache – banker
 Tallulah Bankhead – actress
 Joseph Baratta investor
 Amzi L. Barber – asphalt tycoon
 Demas Barnes – politician and a United States Representative from New York
 Bernard Baruch – financier
 Robert Bass – businessman and philanthropist
 William Bates – physician
 Stephen Vincent Benét – poet
 Leonard Bernstein – composer, conductor
 Edward Julius Berwind – coal mining magnate
 Heber R. Bishop – businessman and jade collector
 Leon Black – hedge fund manager
 Lloyd Blankfein – banker
 Len Blavatnik – businessman, investor, and philanthropist
 Michael Bloomberg – billionaire philanthropist and former mayor of New York City
 René Bouché – artist and fashion illustrator
John Vernou Bouvier III – socialite, Wall Street stockbroker, and father of Jacqueline Kennedy Onassis and Lee Radziwill
 Eli Broad – entrepreneur
 Irving Brokaw – heir, figure skater, first American to compete in an olympic winter sport.
 Isaac Vail Brokaw – clothing merchant
 Charles Bronfman – businessman and philanthropist
 Edgar Bronfman Jr. – businessman
 Edgar Bronfman Sr. – businessman and philanthropist
 Matthew Bronfman – businessman, entrepreneur and philanthropist
 Arthur William Brown – illustrator
 Catherine Wolfe Bruce – philanthropist
Yul Brynner – actor
 Patricia Buckley – socialite
 William F. Buckley Jr. – author
 Tory Burch – fashion designer
 I. Townsend Burden – heir
 James A. Burden Jr. – industrialist

C
 John T. Cahill – lawyer
 Hervey C. Calkin – U.S. Representative
 Anthony Campagna – real estate developer
 Truman Capote – novelist
 Mariah Carey –  singer
 Andrew Carnegie – industrialist
 Phoebe Cates – actress
 Dick Cavett –  comedian and former talk show host
Marc Chagall – artist
 Robert Chambers – the "Preppie Killer" of Jennifer Levin
 Walid Chammah – executive
 James Chanos – investor
 Gustavo Cisneros – businessman
 Huguette Clark – heiress
 James H. Clark – Netscape founder
 William A. Clark – politician and entrepreneur
 Montgomery Clift – actor
 Gifford A. Cochran – entrepreneur and sportsman
 George M. Cohan –  entertainer, playwright, composer, lyricist, actor, singer, dancer and producer
 Charles Cohen – real estate developer
 Michael Cohen – attorney for Donald Trump
 Roy Cohn – lawyer, mentor to Donald Trump
 Chase Coleman III – hedge fund manager
 George Condo – artist
 Sean Connery – actor
 Mark Consuelos – actor
 Barbara Corcoran – businesswoman, investor, speaker, consultant, syndicated columnist, author, and television personality
 Katie Couric – journalist
 Simon Cowell – television judge and producer
 Gardner Cowles Jr. – publisher
 Ann Coulter – author, political commentator, columnist
 Joan Crawford – actress
 Aimée Crocker (1864–1941) –  heiress, princess, author, world traveler
 George Crocker – businessman

D
 Alexandra Daddario –  actress
 Matthew Daddario – actor
 Antonio Damasio –  neuroscientist
 Rodney Dangerfield – comedian, actor
 William Augustus Darling – politician
 Norman Davis – diplomat
 Edward Coleman Delafield – Colonel and banker
 John DeLorean – engineer, inventor and executive in the U.S. automobile industry
 Oleg Deripaska – oligarch and philanthropist
 Joan Didion –  author
 C. Douglas Dillon – diplomat and politician
 Jamie Dimon –  banker
 Bob Diamond – former group chief executive of Barclays plc
 James Dinan – hedge fund manager
 Julio Mario Santo Domingo – diplomat
 Plácido Domingo –  tenor, conductor and arts administrator
 Marta Domingo –  opera soprano, stage director and designer
 Shaun Donovan (born 1966) – former US Secretary of Housing and Urban Development and Director of the Office of Management and Budget, running for Mayor of New York City
 Glenn Dubin – hedge fund manager
 James Buchanan Duke – businessman
 Henry J. Duveen – art dealer
 Charles Dyson – businessman
 James Dyson – inventor, industrial design engineer and founder of the Dyson company

E
 Cheryl Eisen – interior designer
 Robert H. Ellsworth – art dealer
 Richard Engel – journalist 
 Israel Englander – hedge fund manager
 Jeffrey Epstein – financier and registered sex offender
Walker Evans – photographer, at 112 East 74th Street

F
 Sherman Fairchild – aviation pioneer
 Linda Fairstein (born 1947) – prosecutor and author
 Philip Falcone – businessman
 José Fanjul – sugar baron
 Mia Farrow –  actress
 Barbara Feldon –  actress
 Frank Fertitta III –  entrepreneur
 Jay S. Fishman –  insurance executive
 Marshall Field – entrepreneur
 Stephen Feinberg – investor
 Michael Feinstein – singer
 Edna Ferber – writer
 
 J. Christopher Flowers – investor
 Karen Finerman – hedge fund manager and television personality
 Jonathan Franzen –  National Book Award-winning novelist
 Paul J. Fribourg – businessman
 Henry Clay Frick – industrialist, financier, union-buster, and art patron
 Richard S. Fuld, Jr. – banker

G
 Lady Gaga –  singer
 Gerald Garson –  former NY Supreme Court Justice convicted of accepting bribes
 Ina Garten – author
 Bruce Gelb – businessman and diplomat
 Gordon Getty – businessman, investor, philanthropist and classical music composer
 Pia Getty – filmmaker
 Sarah Michelle Gellar –  actress
 James W. Gerard – lawyer and diplomat
 Ricky Gervais –  comedian, actor
 John Giorno – artist
 Rudy Giuliani – politician, attorney, businessman, public speaker, former mayor of New York City, and attorney to President Donald Trump
 Barbara Goldsmith – author, journalist, and philanthropist
 Danielle Goldstein (born 1985) – American-Israeli show jumper
 Lawrence E. Golub – entrepreneur, philanthropist, and business executive
 Murray H. Goodman – real estate developer
 Noam Gottesman – hedge fund manager
 Jay Gould – railroad developer
 Ulysses S. Grant – 18th President of the United States, Commanding General of the Army, soldier, international statesman, and author
 Peter Grauer – Chairman Bloomberg L.P.
 Kenneth C. Griffin – hedge fund manager
 Bob Guccione – photographer
 Daphne Guinness – heiress, socialite, fashion designer, art collector, model, musician, film producer and actor
 Meyer Guggenheim – patriarch of the Guggenheim family
 Simon Guggenheim – politician
 Randolph Guggenheimer – lawyer
 Thomas Guinzburg – publisher
 John Gutfreund – investment banker

H
 J. Hooker Hamersley – heir, lawyer and poet
 W. Averell Harriman – governor of New York
 Joshua Harris – investor
 Kitty Carlisle Hart – singer, advocate for the arts and historic preservation
 Henry Osborne Havemeyer – industrialist
 Millicent Hearst – wife of media tycoon William Randolph Hearst
 Drue Heinz – patron of the literary arts, actress, philanthropist and socialite
 Ariel Helwani – mixed martial arts writer
 Ernest Hemingway – writer 
 Jim Henson – puppeteer, artist, cartoonist, inventor, screenwriter, and filmmaker
 Leon Hess – founder and President of Hess Corporation and one-time owner of the New York Jets
 David M. Heyman (1891–1984)  – financier, philanthropist, art collector
 Tommy Hilfiger – fashion designer
 J. Tomilson Hill – investor
 Henry Hilton – jurist and businessman
 Dennis Hoey – actor
 Lena Horne – singer
 Vladimir Horowitz – pianist and composer
 Harry Houdini – escape artist, illusionist, stunt performer and mysteriarch    
 Alan Howard – hedge fund manager

I
 Bob Iger – CEO

J
 Michael Jackson – singer
 Jeremy Jacobs, Sr. – owner of the Boston Bruins
 Morton L. Janklow – literary agent
 Jasper Johns – artist
 Boris Johnson – Prime Minister of the United Kingdom
 Woody Johnson – businessman, philanthropist, and diplomat
 Star Jones – lawyer, television personality

K
 Harry Kargman – CEO of Kargo
 Jill Kargman – author, writer and actress
 Herbert Kasper – fashion designer
 George S. Kaufman – playwright
 Slim Keith – socialite
 Caroline Kennedy – author, United States Ambassador (2013–2017) to Japan, and daughter of U.S. President John F. Kennedy
 James Powell Kernochan – businessman and clubman
 Otto Hermann Kahn – investment banker, collector, philanthropist, and patron of the arts
 Kevin Kline – actor
 Stephen King – author 
 Sante Kimes – criminal
 David H. Koch – businessman, philanthropist, conservative political activist
 Frederick R. Koch – collector and philanthropist
 Doron Kochavi – businessman, lawyer, philanthropist
 Pannonica de Koenigswarter – jazz patron and write
 Jeff Koons – artist
 Jerzy Kosiński – novelist
 Bruce Kovner – hedge fund manager
 Dennis Kozlowski – former CEO of Tyco International
 Nicola Kraus – novelist
 Peter S. Kraus – businessman, philanthropist and art collector
 Henry Kravis – investor
 Jared Kushner – investor, real-estate developer, newspaper publisher, senior advisor to President Donald Trump

L
 Thomas W. Lamont – banker
 Marc Lasry – hedge fund manager
 Aerin Lauder – businesswoman
 Jane Lauder – businesswoman
 Leonard Lauder – businessman, art collector and humanitarian
 William Lauder – businessman, and executive chairman of the Estée Lauder Companie
 Matt Lauer – news anchor
 Charles Lazarus – founder of Toys R Us
 Lewis Cass Ledyard – lawyer
 Harper Lee – author
 Spike Lee – film director and producer
 William B. Leeds – businessman
 Louise Linton – actress
 Loida Nicolas Lewis – businesswoman who is the widow of TLC Beatrice founder and CEO Reginald Lewis
 Robert I. Lipp –  businessman
 John Langeloth Loeb Jr. – businessman, philanthropist, former United States Ambassador to Denmark, and former Delegate to the United Nations

M
 John J. Mack – banker
 Julie Macklowe – beauty entrepreneur and businesswoman
Andrew Madoff – stockbroker and investment advisor
 Bernard Madoff – ex-hedge fund manager convicted of running a Ponzi scheme

 Carolyn Maloney, politician, former member of United States House of Representatives and the New York City Council

 Stewart and Cyril Marcus – gynecologists
 Soong Mei-ling – former First Lady of the Republic of China, known as Madame Chiang Kai-shek or Madame Chiang
 Princess Madeleine, Duchess of Hälsingland and Gästrikland – Duchess of Hälsingland and Gästrikland
 Madonna – entertainer; purchased $40 million mansion on East 81st Street at Lexington Avenue in 2009
 Anne Windfohr Marion – rancher, horse breeder, business executive, philanthropist, and art collector
 Barbara Margolis –  prisoners' rights advocate, official greeter of New York City
 Howard Marks – investor
 Paul Marks – medical doctor, researcher and administrator
 Malachi Martin –  author
 Wednesday Martin – author
 J. Ezra Merkin – hedge fund manager
 Rachel Lambert Mellon – horticulturalist, gardener, philanthropist, and art collector
 Charles E. Merrill – philanthropist, stockbroker, and co-founder of Merrill Lynch
 Howard Michaels –  founder of the real estate investment advisory firm the Carlton Group
 Bette Midler – singer
 George W. Miller – politician
 Robert Mnuchin – banker
 Steven Mnuchin – investment banker, film producer, hedge fund manager, and Secretary of the US Treasury 
Mary Tyler Moore – actress, producer, and social advocate, at 927 Fifth Avenue at East 74th Street
 Sonja Morgan
 Robert Moses – city planner, public official, referred to as the "master builder" of New York
 Levi P. Morton – 22nd Vice President of the United States, ambassador, and former governor of New York 
 Charles Murphy – hedge fund manager
 James Murdoch – businessman
 Rupert Murdoch – media mogul
 Wendi Deng Murdoch – businesswoman, and movie producer
 Arthur Murray – dancer

N
 Spyros Niarchos – shipping magnate
 Cynthia Nixon –  LGBTQ actress and politician/activist
 Peggy Noonan –  speechwriter for Ronald Reagan, political commentator and author
 Deborah Norville –  television anchor and businesswoman

O
 Jacqueline Kennedy Onassis – former First Lady of the United States
 Stanley O'Neal – banker
 Chris Noth – actor
 Frederick Osborn – philanthropist, military leader, and eugenicist
 Katharina Otto-Bernstein – filmmaker

P
 Ashraf Pahlavi – twin sister of the deposed Shah
 William S. Paley – executive
 Vikram Pandit – banker
 Dorothy Parker – poet, short story writer, critic, and satirist
 Carlos Rodriguez-Pastor – businessman
 Joan Whitney Payson – heiress, businesswoman, philanthropist, patron of the arts and art collector, and a member of the prominent Whitney family
 Sister Parish – interior decorator and socialite
 Antenor Patiño – tycoon
 George Plimpton – author, humorist, NFL quarterback
 Generoso Pope – Italian-American businessman and newspaper publisher, lived at 1040 Fifth Avenue
 Zac Posen – fashion designer
 John Paulson – hedge fund manager
 Nelson Peltz – investor
 Holly Peterson – producer, journalist and novelist
 Peter George Peterson – investment banker and United States Secretary of Commerce
 Milton Petrie – retail investor
 Ronald Perelman – investor
 Peter O. Price – media proprietor
 Harold Prince – theatrical producer and director
 Joseph Pulitzer – newspaper publisher

R
 Lee Radziwill –  princess, sister of Jacqueline Kennedy Onassis
 Lynn Pressman Raymond –  toy and game innovator, president of the Pressman Toy Corporation
 Stewart Rahr – pharmaceuticals magenta
 Steven M. Rales – businessman
 Michael Rapaport –  actor, internet personality, podcaster
 Robert Redford – actor
 Ira Rennert – investor and businessman
 Kelly Ripa – talk show host
 Joan Rivers –  comedian
 David Rockefeller – banker
 John D. Rockefeller Jr. – financier and philanthropist
 Laurance Rockefeller – philanthropist, businessman, financier, and major conservationist
 Felix Rohatyn – investment banker
 Julia Restoin Roitfeld –  art director and model
 Eleanor Roosevelt – political figure, diplomat and activist
 Elihu Root – former Secretary of State
 Steve Ross – CEO of Time Warner
 James Rorimer – museum director
 Aby Rosen – real estate developer
 Alexander Rovt – real estate investor
 Marc Rowan – investor
 Helena Rubinstein – businesswoman, art collector, and philanthropist
 Serge Rubinstein – stock and currency manipulator and murder victim
 Jacob Ruppert – brewer
 Nawwaf bin Abdulaziz Al Saud – Saudi royal

S
 Lily Safra – philanthropist and socialite
 Walter J. Salmon Sr. – real estate developer
 Nassef Sawiris – CEO
 Jacob Schiff – banker
 Martin Scorsese – film director and producer
 Stephen Schwarzman – businessman
 Arthur Hawley Scribner – president of Charles Scribner's Sons
 Charles R. Schwab – investor, financial executive, and philanthropist
 Ryan Seacrest – radio personality, television host, and producer
 Terry Semel – Yahoo! CEO
 Bishop Sheen – religious leader
 Leonard Sillman – broadway producer
 David Simon – CEO of Simon Malls
 Ramona Singer – TV personality
 Harry Slatkin – businessman, entrepreneur, and philanthropist 
 William Douglas Sloane – businessman, sportsman, philanthropist
 Al Smith – former governor of New York
 George Soros – hedge fund manager
 Andy Spade – fashion designer
 Kate Spade – fashion designer
 Jerry Speyer – real estate developer
 Carl Spielvogel – ambassador to the Slovak Republic
 Eliot Spitzer – former Governor of New York
 Kenneth I. Starr – money manager
 John Steinbeck – author
 Saul Steinberg – businessman
 Benjamin Steinbruch – CEO
 Gloria Steinem – journalist
 Michael Steinhardt – financier
 George Stephanopoulos – journalist, political commentator and former Democratic advisor
 Isaac Newton Phelps Stokes – architect
 Willard Dickerman Straight – investment banker, publisher, reporter, Army Reserve officer, diplomat and by marriage, a member of the Whitney family
 Jesse I. Straus – ambassador to France
 Roger Williams Straus Jr. – entrepreneur
 Igor Stravinsky – composer
 Margaret Rockefeller Strong – activist
 Robert L. Stuart – industrialist
 Arthur Ochs Sulzberger, publisher and businessman
 Arthur Ochs Sulzberger, Jr. – publisher
 Sy Syms – founder and owner of Syms Corporation discount clothing retailer and benefactor of Yeshiva University's Syms School of Business

T
 Elie Tahari – fashion designer
 A. Alfred Taubman – businessman, investor, and philanthropist
 Margaretta Taylor – media heiress
 John Thain – banker
 Chloe Temtchine – singer-songwriter
 Jonathan Tisch – Chairman and CEO of Loews Hotels & Co.
 Wilma Tisch – socialite
 Ronn Torossian – public relations executive
 Donald Trump Jr. – businessman and former reality television personality
 Ivana Trump – former model and businesswoman, who was the first wife of Donald Trump
 Ivanka Trump – American businesswoman, fashion designer, author, reality television personality, daughter of Donald Trump
 Vanessa Trump – socialite, actress and former model

U
 James Ramsey Ullman – writer and mountaineer
 Roberto Mangabeira Unger – philosopher and politician
 Louis Untermeyer – author, anthologist, editor, poet

V
 Alice Claypoole Vanderbilt – wife of Cornelius Vanderbilt II
 Anne Harriman Vanderbilt – heiress
 Gloria Vanderbilt – artist, author, actress, fashion designer, heiress, and socialite
 William Kissam Vanderbilt II – motor racing enthusiast and yachtsman
 Margit Varga – artist, painter, gallerist, art director, journalist
 Gary Vaynerchuk – entrepreneur, author, speaker and Internet personality
 Leila and Massimo Vignelli – designers
 Vincent Viola – businessman

W
 Mike Wallace – journalist
 Vera Wang – fashion designer
 Felix M. Warburg
 James Warburg – banker
 Paul Warburg – banker
 Andy Warhol – artist
 Bruce Wasserstein – investment banker
 Claude Wasserstein – investor, producer and philanthropist
 Franz Waxman – composer
 Sigourney Weaver – actress
 Susan Weber
 Michel David-Weill – banker
 Boaz Weinstein – hedge fund manager
 Les Wexner – businessman
 Lawrence Grant White – architect
 Mary Jo White – Chair of the U.S. Securities and Exchange Commission
 William Collins Whitney – political leader and financier
 Gertrude Vanderbilt Whitney – sculptor, art patron, collector, and founder of the Whitney Museum of American Art
 Elie Wiesel – Holocaust survivor and winner of the Nobel Peace Prize in 1986
Elisha Wiesel (born 1972) – businessman; chief information officer of Goldman Sachs; son of Elie Wiesel
 Alec N. Wildenstein – businessman, art dealer, racehorse owner, and breeder
 Jocelyn Wildenstein – socialite
 Robert B. Willumstad – CEO of AIG
 P. G. Wodehouse – author
 Tom Wolfe – novelist, founder of New Journalism
 Jayne Wrightsman – philanthropist

Y
 Charles Yerkes – financier

Z
 Pia Zadora – actress
 Paula Zahn – journalist
 Jeff Zucker – media executive
 Mortimer Zuckerman – media mogul

See also
 List of people from New York City

References

Upper East Side